Mallakastër District was one of the 36 districts of Albania, which were dissolved in July 2000 and replaced by 12 newly created counties. It is in the south of the country, and its capital was the town of Ballsh.

Administrative divisions
The district consisted of the following municipalities:

 Aranitas
 Ballsh
 Fratar
 Greshicë
 Hekal
 Kutë
 Ngraçan
 Qendër
 Selitë

Note: - urban municipalities in bold

References

Districts of Albania
Geography of Fier County